The following is a list of events affecting Philippine television in 2023. Events listed include television show debuts, finales, cancellations, and channel launches, closures and rebrandings, as well as information about controversies and carriage disputes.

Events

January
 January 1
 After nine years and three months of broadcasting in the Philippines, BabyFirst has ceased its broadcast operations across South East Asia by First Media (under the Philippine channel distribution by Cable Boss) due to permanent discontinuation of its telecast by the content provider.
 After five years and eight months of e-sports and gaming broadcast coverage, Cignal TV and Solar Entertainment Corporation (for its pay TV channel distribution since 2020) ceased its broadcast operations of eGG Network in the Philippines as the contract with MEASAT Satellite Systems (under the joint venture of Rocketfuel Entertainment Sdn Bhd.) has terminated on that date. Due to the closure of the said network in the region that follows the review of the management's decision through changes in business direction.
 Sky Cable terminated Fight Sports on its line-up for the second time due to the expiration of Sky's contract with the network since April 1, 2021. Meanwhile, the network continued to air via Cignal.
 Cignal terminated two channels: beIN Sports 1 and beIN Sports 3 on its line-up due to the expiration of Cignal's contract with the said networks. Meanwhile, beIN Sports 1 and beIN Sports 3 continued to air via Sky Cable and G Sat.
 January 5 - Sonshine Media Network International migrated its broadcast signal reception to digital terrestrial transmission from switching off its analog frequency in nationwide areas after 17 years.
 January 12 - GMA Network and Viu sealed a five-year deal to air of selected GMA's primetime programs on the latter's streaming service.
 January 16 - GMA Network launched its Pinoy throwback subchannel on digital terrestrial television, Pinoy Hits.
 January 23 - ABS-CBN Corporation and GMA Network signed a historic deal for the co-production of the upcoming teleserye.
 January 29 - Viva Entertainment launched a secondary over-the-top content platform, Viva Prime, and began its soft operations which include movies and TV series content from the Viva library. It rebranded as Viva One on February 25.
 January 30 - After its soft launch on May 9, 2022, Aliw Broadcasting Corporation's IZTV rebranded as Aliw Channel 23.

February
 February 1
 Biyahe ni Drew celebrated its 10th anniversary on Philippine television.
 G Sat terminated IBC, Outdoor Channel and SMNI on its line-up due to the revamping of the provider's channel space assignments. Meanwhile, Outdoor Channel continued to air via Cignal, SatLite, Sky Cable and Cablelink, IBC 13 continued to air via Free TV Channel 13 on Analog and Channel 17 on Digital in Metro Manila, Cignal, SatLite, Sky Cable and Cablelink and SMNI continued to air via Free TV Channel 39 on Digital in Metro Manila, Cignal and Sky Cable. In addition, G Sat launched All TV, Cinema One and Solar Flix on their line-up.
 February 12 - Jeromy Melendez Batac, Marcus Rayden Cabais, Kenji "Kyler" Chua, Gabriel "Vinci" Malizon, Reyster Yton, Kim Just Ng, and Winston Pineda were hailed of the top seven aspirants will make their debut in South Korea as members of the boy group HORI7ON, following the finale of the survival show Dream Maker.
 February 13 - Ang Iglesia ni Cristo celebrated its 40th anniversary on Philippine television.
 February 14 - A day after its debut, the production unit team of ABS-CBN's primetime series, FPJ's Batang Quiapo has apologized to the Muslim community due to a scene where Coco Martin's character Tanggol sought the help of his Muslim friend Abdul–portrayed by Rez Cortez as he was being pursued by the police. Tanggol took refuge in the company of armed Muslim men whom the police were hesitant to take action due to fear of retribution. A number of Muslim Filipinos took offense and criticised the portrayal as reinforcing negative stereotypes against them, with some calling for a boycott of the series. MTRCB chairperson, Lala Sotto-Antonio later released a statement on the said controversy. Senator Robin Padilla, a Muslim, gave a statement regarding the controversial episode.
 February 18 - Mary Delle Cascabel was hailed as first grand champion of “Girl On Fire” on It's Showtime.
 February 19 - Swara Sug Media Corporation (a broadcast arm of the Kingdom of Jesus Christ that operates Sonshine Media Network International led by their church leader and televangelist Pastor Apollo C. Quiboloy) has officially signed on via digital terrestrial television frequency on Channel 43 during the first Global Thanksgiving and Worship presentation at the Ynares Center in Antipolo City, Rizal. The network covered in Metro Manila and nearby provinces. Channel 43 will be used as the main channel of SMNI News Channel on DTT, while retaining the use of SMNI on Channel 39 as a secondary channel after transitioning from analog to digital signal. The frequency was formerly used by AMCARA Broadcasting Network under blocktime agreement with ABS-CBN Corporation to air its digital channels on ABS-CBN TV Plus.
 February 21 - Social media influencer and blogger, Toni Fowler and Freshbreed’s “M.P.L.” did not receive a Strong Parental Guidance (SPG) rating from the Movie and Television Review and Classification Board contradictory to one of its cast’s claim that the agency granted the said rating to the controversial music video. In after the MTRCB received a number of complaints regarding the clip’s explicit content over the weekend and it has released a statement on the said controversy.
 February 27 - Most of the  GMA Network's main channel  alongside with their sister channel, GTV (owned by Citynet Network Marketing and Productions Inc., a wholly owned subsidiary of GMA Network Inc.), as well as four free-to-air GMA Affordabox digital subchannels (Heart of Asia, Hallypop, I Heart Movies and Pinoy Hits) and three pay TV international channels (GMA Pinoy TV and GMA Life TV and GMA News TV International) have switched its airing of aspect ratio format quality on the channel feed and its programming to widescreen format (16:9) as being converted its mitigation of reception through analog (until end of the year) and digital signal reception through free TV and other cable and satellite providers after more than 61 years on the usage of broadcast video picture resolution that migrated from fullscreen format (4:3).

March
 March 4 - Althea Ruedas of Antipolo City, Rizal was hailed as first grand champion of “Little Miss Diva” on Eat Bulaga!.
 March 7 - Kapuso Mo, Jessica Soho issued an official statement on their Facebook account clarifying the recent K-Pop photo card snatching while on public transportation. Two days after the airing of its episode featuring a girl who reportedly stole over ₱2 million from her family to fund her K-pop merchandise collection. According to the official statement, the KMJS team condemns the trolling and harassment of netizens to their staff to make a statement regarding the story of 'Bea' during one of their recent episodes. Furthermore, the KMJS team clarified that the 'Bea' episode is not intended to demean anyone, but rather to serve as a lesson and warning to the community.

Upcoming

March

Unknown (dates)
 After its soft launch on September 13, 2022, Advanced Media Broadcasting System's All TV will make its official launch.
 Philippine Collective Media Corporation plans to launch a national television network in collaboration with several other content providers including ABS-CBN Corporation (where PCMC's owner Martin Romualdez, who is Leyte's 1st District Representative and House Majority Floor Leader, voted one of the 70 representatives to reject the network's broadcast franchise renewal on July 10, 2020).
 The country's analog television stations are set to be shut off as they will shift to digital TV.

Debuts

Major networks

A2Z

The following are programs that debuted on A2Z:

 January 1: Shuffle
 January 23: Dirty Linen
 February 13: FPJ's Batang Quiapo
 February 14: The Great Show
 February 25: The Goodbye Girl and The Voice Kids (season 5)
 March 4: I Can See Your Voice (season 5)
 March 18: Beach Bros

Upcoming

No define date
 Can't Buy Me Love
 Linlang

Re-runs
 January 2: A Soldier's Heart
 January 7: Robocar Poli (Kidz Weekend), Masha and the Bear (Kidz Weekend) and Almost Paradise (season 1)
 January 8: Remi, Nobody's Girl (Kidz Weekend)

Notes
^  Originally aired on ABS-CBN^  Originally aired on Kapamilya Channel^  Originally aired on Yey!

GMA

The following are programs that debuted on GMA Network:

 January 2: You Are My Heartbeat
 January 8: Happy ToGetHer (season 3)
 January 16: Bad Romeo, Luv Is: Caught in His Arms and Underage (television remake)
 January 22: The Clash 2023
 January 23: Fast Talk with Boy Abunda and Poong, the Joseon Psychiatrist (season 1)
 January 30: 46 Days
 February 4: Reporter's Notebook
 February 5: Cayetano in Action with Boy Abunda
 February 6: Pan Tau
 February 13: Detective Conan (season 9)
 February 18: Kamen Rider Zero-One
 February 20: Bai Ling Tan
 February 27: Mga Lihim ni Urduja
 March 6: AraBella and Love Revolution
 March 8: Her Bucket List
 March 11: Dino Dan
 March 13: Hearts on Ice and The Last Promise
 March 20: The Write One

Upcoming

No define date
 Astrophile
 Atty. Mataas
 Battle of the Judges
 Beauty and a Guy
 The Black Rider
 Fates and Furies (Philippine adaptation)
 Jinxed at First
 Lady Boxer
 Lolong: Ang Luha ng Unang Atubaw
 Love and Deception
 Love at First Read
 Love Before Sunrise
 Love. Die. Repeat
 Magandang Dilag
 Mechanical Heart
 The Missing Husband
 Resibo: Walang Lusot ang may Atraso
 Royal Blood
 The Seed of Love
 Shining Inheritance (Philippine adaptation)
 Sparkle University
 Unbreak My Heart
 The Voice Generations
 Voltes V: Legacy
 You Are My Makeup Artist

Re-runs
 January 2: Queen Seondeok
 January 15: Ultraman Taiga
 March 11: Road Trip

TV5

The following are programs that debuted on TV5:

 January 15: Healing Galing sa TV
 January 17: Oras ng Himala
 January 22: The Chiefs
 January 23: Dirty Linen
 February 6: Magandang Buhay
 February 13: FPJ's Batang Quiapo
 February 14: The Great Show
 February 25: The Voice Kids (season 5)
 March 11: I Can See Your Voice (season 5)
 March 18: Kurdapya and Team A

Upcoming

No define date
 Adarna Gang
 The Biggest Search
 Can't Buy Me Love
 The Comeback
 For Your Eyes Only
 IMO: In My Opinion
 Love on da Move
 Linlang
 Nurse Lovely
 Republika Origins

Re-runs
 January 14: John en Ellen (season 1) and Pinoy Explorer
 January 30: Sa Ngalan ng Ina
 February 6: Codename: Kids Next Door, Dexter's Laboratory, Maine Goals (seasons 1 and 2) and The Powerpuff Girls
 March 13: True Beauty

Notes
^  Originally aired on RPN (now CNN Philippines)
^  Originally aired on Studio 23 (now defunct)
^  Originally aired on BuKo Channel
^  Originally aired on GMA

State-owned networks

PTV

The following are programs that debuted on People's Television Network:

 January 21: Saka-Inan
 February 13: Oras ng Himala

Upcoming

IBC

The following are programs that debuted on IBC:

 January 7: NCCT Originals
 January 30: Bitag Live and IpaBITAG Mo
 March 16: EZ Shop
 March 18: TV Shop Philippines

Upcoming
 June 25: Genius Teens

Minor networks
The following are programs that debuted on minor networks:

 January 2: Woori the Virgin on All TV
 January 22: GoodWill on Net 25
 January 23: Mysterious Personal Shopper on Net 25
 January 30: BaliTambayan, IZ Umaga Balita, Pasada Balita, Pinoy Gising!, Ronda Pilipinas and Tandem: David at Jon on Aliw Channel 23
 January 30: Gikan sa Masa, Para sa Masa on SMNI
 February 1: Why Her on All TV
 February 13: Love and Everythaaang on Net 25
 February 20: Department of Help on Aliw Channel 23
 March 4: Reality Check on Net 25
 March 6: Hot Mom and Miracle on All TV
 March 6: Ang Tingog ni Nanay on Light TV
 March 6: Kizim on Net 25
 March 7: Bawat Tibok ng Puso on Light TV
 March 9: Ticktalk on Light TV
 March 10: Our Hope on Light TV
 March 19: Negosyo Goals on All TV
 March 20: Bitag Live and IpaBITAG Mo on CLTV-36
 March 20: If You Wish Upon Me on All TV

Upcoming
 March 21: Papa, Nasa'n ka? on SMNI

No definite date
 Kada Bente Singko on Net 25

Re-runs
 January 2: Till I Met You on All TV
 January 7: Oh My Dad! on All TV
 March 6: Sandugo on All TV

Notes
^  Originally aired on ABS-CBN
^  Originally aired on TV5

Other channels
The following are programs that debuted on other channels: 

 January 2: Mi pecado on Telenovela Channel
 January 7: Aksyon, Tulong, Solusyon on DZRH TV
 January 8: Room No. 9 on GTV
 January 8: Manny Pacquiao Presents: Blow By Blow on One Sports
 January 9: Flames of Vengeance on GTV
 January 9: Dream Maker: Pause and Play on PIE Channel
 January 16: Usapang Bilyonaryo on CNN Philippines
 January 16: Luv Is: Caught in His Arms on GTV and Pinoy Hits
 January 16: 24 Oras, Abot-Kamay na Pangarap, Balitanghali, Dapat Alam Mo!, Maria Clara at Ibarra, Regional TV News, Saksi, Saksi sa Dobol B, Unang Hirit, Underage (television remake) and Unica Hija on Pinoy Hits
 January 20: Bubble Gang and i-Witness on Pinoy Hits
 January 21: 24 Oras Weekend, Brigada, Dobol Weng sa Dobol B, Good News Kasama si Vicky Morales, iJuander, Imbestigador, Pepito Manaloto: Tuloy ang Kwento, Pera Paraan, Pinoy M.D. sa Dobol B, Sarap, 'Di Ba?, Super Balita sa Umaga, Tadhana, Telesine Presents and Wish Ko Lang! on Pinoy Hits
 January 22: Aha!, All Out Sundays, Born to Be Wild, Farm to Table, IBilib, Kapuso Mo, Jessica Soho, Pinas Sarap, Reporter's Notebook and The Boobay and Tekla Show on Pinoy Hits
 January 23: Dirty Linen on Jeepney TV and Kapamilya Channel
 January 23: Fast Talk with Boy Abunda on Pinoy Hits
 February 1: EZ Shop on Pinoy Hits
 February 4: Agri TV ATBP.: Kasama sa Hanapbuhay and Sabong TV on One Sports
 February 4: The Chosen One: Barkadahan on PIE Channel
 February 5: Daig Kayo ng Lola Ko, Kapuso Mo, Jessica Soho and The Boobay and Tekla Show on GTV
 February 5: PIE Shorts on PIE Channel
 February 11: Romance of Dog and Monkey and Hallyflix on Hallypop
 February 11: Cayetano in Action with Boy Abunda on GTV
 February 13: FPJ's Batang Quiapo on Cine Mo! and Kapamilya Channel
 February 13: Are We Alright on GTV
 February 13: Radyo5 Balita Pilipinas on One PH
 February 13: Pak na Pak! Palong Follow on PIE Channel
 February 14: The Great Show on Kapamilya Channel
 February 18: Dear SV on CNN Philippines
 February 18: Papa ng Masa on PIE Channel
 February 19: Tomorrow's Cantabile on GTV
 February 20: General and I on Heart of Asia
 February 20: In Between (ETCerye) on Solar Flix
 February 25: The Goodbye Girl and The Voice Kids (season 5) on Kapamilya Channel
 February 27: Mga Lihim ni Urduja on GTV and Pinoy Hits
 March 4: I Can See Your Voice (season 5) on Kapamilya Channel
 March 6: 24 Oras, Mga Lihim ni Urduja and Luv Is: Caught in His Arms on I Heart Movies
 March 6: AraBella on Pinoy Hits
 March 13: Hearts on Ice on GTV, I Heart Movies and Pinoy Hits
 March 18: Beach Bros on Kapamilya Channel
 March 19: Kurdapya and Team A on Sari-Sari Channel
 March 20: King Maker: The Change of Destiny and The Write One on GTV
 March 20: The Write One on I Heart Movies and Pinoy Hits

Upcoming

No definite date
 Can't Buy Me Love and Linlang on Kapamilya Channel
 The Chosen One (season 2) on PIE Channel

Re-runs
 January 1: Piggy Tales and Yo-kai Watch (season 3) on GTV
 January 1: Hello from the Other Side on Heart of Asia
 January 1: Two Wives (remake) on Jeepney TV
 January 2: VIP on Heart of Asia
 January 2: Bridges of Love and Momay on Jeepney TV
 January 2: A Soldier's Heart on Kapamilya Channel
 January 7: Almost Paradise (season 1) on Kapamilya Channel
 January 9: Bleach (season 1) on GTV
 January 9: Princess Hours and Queen and I on Heart of Asia
 January 16: Prince of Wolf on Heart of Asia
 January 16: Super Laff-In on Cine Mo!
 January 16: Anne of Green Gables, Bagito and Dream Dad on Jeepney TV
 January 16: Tabachingching on BuKo Channel
 January 16: The Better Half on PIE Channel
 January 16: Corazón Salvaje and The Two Lives of Estela Carrillo on Telenovela Channel
 January 16: Because of You, Buena Familia, Dading, Daig Kayo ng Lola Ko, Dwarfina, Kakambal ni Eliana and Pyra: Babaeng Apoy on Pinoy Hits
 January 21: Ang Pinaka, Pop Talk, Reel Time and Taste Buddies on Pinoy Hits
 January 22: Alamat, Ang Mahiwagang Baul, Art Angel, Day Off, Dear Uge, Ismol Family, Sherlock Jr.  and Wagas on Pinoy Hits
 January 30: Hotel del Luna on Kapamilya Channel
 January 30: Romance in the Rain (as "A Kiss in a Rain") (ETCerye) on Solar Flix
 February 4: Lie After Lie on Heart of Asia
 February 5: Gokusen (season 1) on GTV
 February 6: Miss The Dragon on Heart of Asia
 February 12: Ysabella on Jeepney TV
 February 13: H3O: Ha Ha Ha Over on BuKo Channel
 February 13: Code Name: Yong Pal on Heart of Asia
 February 13: Imortal on Jeepney TV
 February 20: One the Woman on Heart of Asia
 February 20: Playhouse on Jeepney TV
 February 27: My Husband in Law on Heart of Asia
 March 4: Art of a Spirit on Heart of Asia
 March 6: Dragon Ball Z on GTV
 March 6: May Isang Pangarap on Jeepney TV
 March 11: Road Trip on Pinoy Hits
 March 12: The Last Empress on Heart of Asia
 March 13: Yo-kai Watch Shadowside on GTV
 March 13: I Hear Your Voice on Heart of Asia
 March 13: Galema: Anak ni Zuma on Jeepney TV
 March 13: Got to Believe on PIE Channel
 March 18: The Bureau of Magical Things on GTV
 March 18: Game of Affection and Playful Kiss on Heart of Asia
 March 20: Since I Found You and We Will Survive on Jeepney TV

Upcoming
 March 27: La Luna Sangre on Jeepney TV

Notes
^  Originally aired on ABS-CBN
^  Originally aired on GMA
^  Originally aired on TV5
^  Originally aired on Cine Mo!
^  Originally aired on Yey!
^  Originally aired on S+A (now defunct)
^  Originally aired on GMA News TV (now GTV)
^  Originally aired on Jeepney TV
^  Originally aired on Sari-Sari Channel
^  Originally aired on Hero (now defunct)
^  Originally aired on ETC (now Solar Flix)
^  Originally aired on Jack TV (now defunct)
^  Originally aired on 2nd Avenue (now defunct)
^  Originally aired on CT (now defunct)
^  Originally aired on Studio 23 (now defunct)
^  Originally aired on Q (now GTV)
^  Originally aired on RPN (now CNN Philippines)
^  Originally aired on Fox Filipino (now defunct)
^  Originally aired on Kapamilya Channel
^  Originally aired on Metro Channel
^  Originally aired on Asianovela Channel (now defunct)
^  Originally aired on NBN (now PTV)
^  Originally aired on Knowledge Channel
^  Originally aired on CNN Philippines
^  Originally aired on A2Z
^  Originally aired on GTV
^  Originally aired on IBC
^  Originally aired on ABC (now TV5)

Video streaming services
The following are programs that debuted on video streaming services:

 January 7: Boys After Dark on YouTube (ABS-CBN Entertainment)
 March 10: Zero Kilometers Away on YouTube (GMA Public Affairs)
 March 17: Teen Clash on iWantTFC
 March 18: The Write One on Viu

Upcoming
 March 26: Sssshhh!  on VivaMax
 May 1: The Rain in España on Viva One

No definite date
 Comedy Island: Philippines on Amazon Prime Video
 Drag Race Philippines (season 2) and Drag Race Philippines: Untucked! (season 2) on Discovery+ and WOW Presents Plus
 Call My Agent! (Philippine adaptation), Drag Race Philippines (season 2) and Drag Race Philippines: Untucked! (season 2) on HBO Go
 Drag You & Me on iWantTFC
 A Love to Kill (Philippine adaptation) on Netflix

Returning or renamed programs

Major networks

State-owned networks

Minor networks

Other channels

Video streaming services

Programs transferring networks

Major networks

State-owned networks

Minor networks

Other channels

Video streaming services

Milestone episodes
The following shows that made their milestone episodes in 2023:

Finales

Major networks

A2Z

The following are programs that will end on A2Z:

 January 20: Flower of Evil (rerun)
 February 5: Almost Paradise (season 1; rerun)
 February 10: Ever Night: War of Brilliant Splendours and Mars Ravelo's Darna: The TV Series (2022)
 February 12: Dream Maker
 February 19: Everybody, Sing! (season 2)
 February 25: Mr. Bean: The Animated Series (season 3; Kidz Weekend)
 March 12: The Goodbye Girl

Scheduled

Stopped airing

GMA

The following are programs that will end on GMA Network:

 January 12: Agimat ng Agila (season 1; rerun)
 January 13: Mano Po Legacy: The Flower Sisters and Nakarehas na Puso
 January 14: Ultraman R/B (rerun)
 January 20: Another Miss Oh
 January 27: What's Wrong with Secretary Kim
 January 29: Telesine Presents
 February 3: Ancient Love Poetry
 February 11: Dragon Ball Z (rerun)
 February 17: Pan Tau
 February 24: Maria Clara at Ibarra
 March 3: Unica Hija and You Are My Heartbeat
 March 4: Ang Pinaka
 March 5: Martin Mystery (rerun)
 March 7: Poong, the Joseon Psychiatrist (season 1)
 March 10: 46 Days and Luv Is: Caught in His Arms
 March 17: Her Bucket List

Scheduled

Stopped airing

TV5

The following are programs that will end on TV5:

 January 7: The Brillant Life
 January 8: From Helen's Kitchen (season 3)
 January 20: Flower of Evil and Mag Badget Tayo
 January 24: Ang Panday (2016; rerun)
 February 3: Camp Lazlo (rerun), Dragons: Race to the Edge (rerun), Foster's Home For Imaginary Friends (rerun), Moonbug Cartoons (Cocomelon, Go Buster and Little Baby Bum), Trolls: The Beat Goes On! (rerun) and Uncle Grandpa
 February 10: Ever Night: War of Brilliant Splendours and Mars Ravelo's Darna: The TV Series (2022)
 February 19: Everybody, Sing! (season 2)
 February 25: John en Ellen (season 1; rerun)
 March 4: TikTalks
 March 9: Encounter (Philippine adaptation; rerun)
 March 11: Pinoy Explorer (rerun)

Scheduled

Stopped airing

State-owned networks

PTV 

The following are programs that ended on People's Television Network:
 January 6: Bitag Live

Scheduled

Stopped airing

IBC

The following are programs that ended on IBC:

 January 29: Agri TV ATBP.: Kasama sa Hanapbuhay and Sabong TV

Scheduled

Stopped airing

Minor networks
The following are programs that ended on minor networks:

 January 1: From Now On, Showtime! and Ngayon at Kailanman on All TV
 January 20: A Place in the Sun on Net 25
 January 27: Balitaan at Kamustaan, Balitang Todo Lakas, Dear Ate Juday, IZ Balita Nationwide sa Hapon, IZ Balita Nationwide sa Tanghali, IZ Balita Nationwide sa Umaga, O.R.O. (Obserbasyon, Reaksiyon at Opinyon) sa DWIZ, Ratsada sa Umaga and Serbisyong Lubos sa 882 on IZTV (now Aliw 23)
 January 31: Woori the Virgin on All TV
 February 17: StorIZ of Love on Aliw 23
 March 3: Daydreamer on Net 25
 March 5: EZ Shop, Sana Dalawa ang Puso and Why Her? on All TV
 March 19: Miracle on All TV

Scheduled

Other channels
The following are programs that ended on other channels:

 January 6: The Merciless Judge on GTV
 January 6: Doctor John and The Heirs on Heart of Asia
 January 8: Christmas Cartoon Festival Presents (rerun) and Pusong Pinoy sa Amerika (season 17) on GTV
 January 13: Tinderella on BuKo Channel
 January 13: Yes, Yes Show! on Cine Mo!
 January 13: Mano Po Legacy: The Flower Sisters on GTV
 January 13: Bad Genius: The Series on Heart of Asia
 January 13: Ikaw ay Pag-Ibig (rerun), Katorse (rerun) and The Trapp Family Singers on Jeepney TV
 January 13: Love to Death and Moon Daughters on Telenovela Channel
 January 14: Boy For Rent on GTV
 January 20: Flower of Evil (rerun) on Jeepney TV and Kapamilya Channel
 January 20: My Sweet Lie (ETCerye) on Solar Flix
 January 27: Love in Sadness (rerun) on Kapamilya Channel
 January 27: HaPinay on TeleRadyo
 January 29: The Big Picture on GTV
 January 29: Oh My Baby (rerun) on Heart of Asia
 February 3: Douluo Continent on Heart of Asia
 February 4: The Worst Witch (season 3, rerun) and Fear Times on GTV
 February 5: Rainbow Prince on Heart of Asia
 February 5: Prinsesa ng Banyera (rerun) on Jeepney TV
 February 5: Almost Paradise (season 1; rerun) on Kapamilya Channel
 February 10: Iskul Bukol on BuKo Channel
 February 10: Mars Ravelo's Darna: The TV Series (2022) on Cine Mo!
 February 10: Hogu's Love on GTV
 February 10: VIP on Heart of Asia
 February 10: Bagito (rerun) and Ever Night: War of Brilliant Splendours on Jeepney TV
 February 10: Ever Night: War of Brilliant Splendours and Mars Ravelo's Darna: The TV Series (2022) on Kapamilya Channel
 February 11: PIEgalingan on PIE Channel
 February 12: Dream Maker
 February 12: Pak! Palong Follow on PIE Channel
 February 17: Queen and I and Scarlet Heart (rerun) on Heart of Asia
 February 17: The Better Half (rerun) on Jeepney TV
 February 18: Delayed Justice on GTV
 February 19: Everybody, Sing! (season 2) on Kapamilya Channel
 February 24: Maria Clara at Ibarra on GTV and Pinoy Hits
 February 24: Prince of Wolf (rerun) on Heart of Asia
 February 25: Secret Garden (rerun) on Heart of Asia
 March 3: Magkaribal (rerun) on Jeepney TV
 March 3: Unica Hija on Pinoy Hits
 March 3: TikTalks and Wag Po! on One PH
 March 4: Ang Pinaka on Pinoy Hits
 March 5: Jackie Chan Adventures (rerun) on GTV
 March 5: Hello From the Other Side (rerun) on Heart of Asia
 March 10: Luv Is: Caught in His Arms on GTV, I Heart Movies and Pinoy Hits
 March 10: Princess Hours on Heart of Asia
 March 10: Bridges of Love (rerun) on Jeepney TV
 March 10: On the Wings of Love on PIE Channel
 March 11: Love Alert (rerun) on Heart of Asia
 March 12: Heirs of the Night and Yo-kai Watch (season 3; rerun) on GTV
 March 12: Lie After Lie (rerun) on Heart of Asia
 March 12: The Goodbye Girl on Kapamilya Channel
 March 16: Saksi on GTV
 March 17: Flames of Vengeance on GTV
 March 17: Kahit Puso'y Masugatan and Kristine (rerun) on Jeepney TV

Scheduled
 March 24: Miss the Dragon on Heart of Asia
 March 24: Got to Believe (rerun) on Jeepney TV

Stopped airing

Miscellaneous

Video streaming services

 January 26: Drag Den on Amazon Prime Video
 February 3: K-Love on Viu

Scheduled

Stopped streaming

Networks
The following are a list of free-to-air and cable channels or networks launches and closures in 2023.

Launches
The following are a list of free-to-air and cable channels or networks launches and closures in 2023.

Rebranded
The following is a list of television stations or cable channels that have made or will make noteworthy network rebrands in 2023.

Closures

Services
The following are a list of television operators or providers and streaming media platforms or services launches and closures in 2023.

Launches

Rebranded
The following is a list of streaming providers that have made or will make noteworthy service rebrands in 2023.

Deaths
February
 February 17 - Maurice Arcache (b. 1934), veteran lifestyle columnist and co-host of Oh No! It's Johnny!.

See also
 2023 in television

References

2023 in Philippine television
Television in the Philippines by year
Philippine television-related lists